Burnaston is a village and civil parish in the South Derbyshire district of Derbyshire, England. It contains the headquarters and vehicle manufacturing plant of Toyota Manufacturing UK, built on the site of the former Derby Airport.

Demography
The population of the civil parish at the census of 2011 was 1,531.

Geography

History
Burnaston House was originally the home of the Every family including Ashton Nicholas Every Mosley, who was the High Sheriff of Derbyshire in 1835. The house became the social centre and clubhouse for Derby Aero Club and Derby Aviation in the 1940s, when the grass field to the south east was operated as Derby Airport. 

The house was eventually demolished in March 1990 to make way for the car factory, which opened nearly three years later.

Economy

The village is known for Toyota TMUK, one of several British car plants built by Japanese carmakers as part of measures to avoid expenses such as import duties and shipping costs. Following the decision by Toyota during the second half of the 1980s to build a new factory in Europe, the plant was established in December 1989 and opened on 16 December 1992.

Transport
The site for Toyota also covers the area formerly occupied by Derby Airport, a grass airfield that opened in 1938 as the municipal airport for Derby. 

During World War II it was used for military training purposes. After the war it was again used by airlines, including Derby Aviation (later Derby Airways then British Midland Airways), until 1965, when the newly reconstructed East Midlands Airport opened across the county border in Leicestershire. 

Private flying from Burnaston continued until December 1989, when the site was taken over by Toyota for the development of the car factory over the next three years.

Education
Burnaston was the location of Burnaston College Junior School for Boys, established in 1912.

See also
Listed buildings in Burnaston

Notes

References

External links

Villages in Derbyshire
South Derbyshire District
Civil parishes in Derbyshire